Winnie Johnson-Marquart (born 1958/1959) is an American billionaire heir, and the daughter of Samuel Curtis Johnson Jr. and the great great granddaughter of S. C. Johnson & Son founder Samuel Curtis Johnson Sr.

She graduated from Cornell University in 1981. She has been the president and a trustee of the Johnson Family Foundation but never wanted to partake to the family affairs.

Family
Winnie Johnson-Marquart is married to rock musician Michael Marquart and has a daughter Samantha, who is studio manager at Windmark Recording.

References

Cornell University alumni
Samuel Curtis Johnson family
American billionaires
American businesspeople
Female billionaires
Year of birth missing (living people)
Living people
1950s births